ZDF most often refers to Zweites Deutsches Fernsehen, a German broadcasting corporation.

ZDF may also refer to:

 Zambian Defence Force, the combined military forces of Zambia
 ZDF rat, a laboratory rat
 Zimbabwe Defence Forces, the combined military forces of Zimbabwe